The Pirates of Dark Water is an American fantasy animated television series created by David Kirschner and produced by Hanna-Barbera. The series premiered as a five-part miniseries on Fox Kids early 1991. The first season, consisting of 13 episodes including the original five-part miniseries, aired on ABC from September to December 1991. A second season, consisting of just eight episodes, aired in syndication in the United States from 1992 to 1993.

Premise
Ren, the son of the dying King Primus of Octopon, sails around the alien world of Mer on a ship called the Wraith, searching for the "Thirteen Treasures of Rule". His loyal crew of misfits that help Ren on his journey are the ecomancer Tula, a monkey-bird Niddler, and the treasure-hungry pirate Ioz. Ren's opponent in his quest is the pirate Bloth of the warship the Maelstron, who will stop at nothing to get the treasures for himself.

Characters

Heroes
 Ren (voiced by George Newbern) – The prince of the once-grand kingdom of Octopon and the main protagonist of the series. Ren was raised by a lighthouse keeper in the outskirts of his homeland, unaware of his destiny and heritage. He wields the broken sword that belonged to his father in its whole form. By the second half of the first season, he freed one half of the planet from the Dark Water.
 Niddler (voiced by Roddy McDowall in the miniseries, Frank Welker in the TV series) – A monkey-bird who once belonged to Bloth until he escaped by aiding Ren's own escape from the pirate captain. He hails from the island of Pandawa. Niddler is usually depicted as a little greedy and constantly ravenous for food, his favorite food being minga melons, but he likes Ren and his ability to fly often comes in handy.
 Tula (voiced by Jodi Benson) – She is an ecomancer with the ability to control the elements and biological life, both sentient and non-sentient, as well as a natural affinity towards nature and animals. She is headstrong and often flusters Ioz. Tula is introduced as being a simple barmaid, but she stows aboard Ren and Ioz's ship, claiming she "wanted to get away from the drudgery of life on land." It's soon revealed that she's a character with many secrets.
 Ioz (voiced first by Hector Elizondo in earlier episodes, Jim Cummings in later episodes) – A rogue and pirate, he joins up with Ren initially for the promise of treasure. Throughout the seasons, his character matures and he becomes fond of Ren and his idealism, evolving into a protective brotherly figure to him and often risking his life for Ren and the quest for the Treasures. However, he still continues his attempts at getting rich quickly but is mostly unsuccessful. Ioz also has a younger sister named Solia, who appears in the series. Like Niddler, he originally worked for Bloth, but "it ended ugly" according to him.
 Zoolie (voiced by Dick Gautier) – A jolly, redheaded rogue who runs a gamehouse in Janda-Town. He and Ioz crewed together on Bloth's ship the Maelstrom. Though not a main character, he does make recurring appearances by offering advice and assisting Ren and his friends whenever they make port in Janda-Town.
 Teron (voiced by Dan O'Herlihy) – He is a supreme ecomancer who sprouts roots from his body in order to replenish himself from a portable supply of native soil when he is away from his homeland, Andorus. He is first seen in the series as a prisoner on Bloth's ship, and Bloth uses his power for evil, in turn exhausting the local environment and its positive life-energy. Tula has great respect for him as an ecomancer, and she was sent on a mission to bring him back to Andorus to heal the Dark Water-ravaged island. Teron also helps Tula adjust to her new powers as an ecomancer when they first manifest themselves.

Villains
 Bloth (voiced by Brock Peters) – The ox-sized, humanoid pirate captain of the feared pirate ship Maelstrom and one of the primary antagonists of the series. Bloth is after the Thirteen Treasures of Rule to control all the Dark Water in the world and in effect Mer itself. He destroyed Primus's fleet seventeen years prior to the timeline of the show and captured Primus and his aide Avagon, though the seven captains accompanying Primus were able to escape with the Treasures. Bloth has since been hunting them obsessively and destroying every remnant of the House of Primus just as obsessively, including killing every heir to the throne of Octopon that he could find and ravaging and pillaging the ailing city. He held Primus captive for seventeen years before the old man escaped back to Octopon and to Ren. Upon learning that Primus has a son, he transferred his fanatical hatred of Primus to Ren. Bloth began to hunt the boy across the twenty seas of Mer in order to capture the Treasures and to kill Ren and the house of Primus. In the second half of the first season, he makes an uncertain and untrusting alliance with Morpho, a major agent of the Dark Dweller.
 Mantus (voiced by Peter Cullen) – Bloth's second-in-command. He offers his cool and calculating personality as a battle strategist for Bloth's fleet.
 Konk (voiced by Tim Curry) – A short, fat pirate who works for Bloth. He lost his leg thanks to a close encounter with his master's ferocious pet the Constrictus. For a long time, Konk was the only one to ever survive being thrown to the monster. Although not particularly smart, Konk possesses more bluster than most of Bloth's crew and is always trying to win Bloth's praise.
 The Lugg Brothers (voiced by Earl Boen and Frank Welker) – Two huge, dimwitted siblings who are members of Bloth's crew. They try to assist Konk, but their stupidity makes them more of a hindrance than anything. They only make appearances as main characters in the first five episodes of the show.
 The Dark Dweller (voiced by Frank Welker) – One of the primary antagonists of the series. The Dark Dweller is a powerful, evil creature that created the Dark Water. He had the Treasures originally scattered because their power is the only thing capable of opposing him and his evil master plan to swallow Mer in Dark Water.
 Morpho (voiced by Neil Ross) – A servant of the Dark Dweller and the leader of his worshippers, the Dark Disciples. He joins forces with Bloth and serves as the above-water liaison for the Dark Dweller, so that they can aid each other in their mutual goal of killing Ren and his friends, though they have two very different goals for the Compass and Treasures. He was an alchemist who was doing research on the Dark Water when the Dark Dweller captured him and transformed him so that he was no longer fully human, making him into an eternal servant. He refers to himself as a creature of two worlds, Ren's and the Dark Dweller's.
 Joat (voiced by Andre Stojka) – A pirate and the previous owner of the Wraith. His ship was stolen by Ioz. He uses his metal claw in place of his left hand mercilessly in battle. Originally slated to have a larger role in the series, his only major appearance was in "The Soul Stealer."

Ships
 The Wraith – A swift, beautiful ship, originally owned by the pirate Joat, that Ioz steals for Ren from the Janda-Town docks. It has a unique, dynamic mainsail that rotates to slow the ship or act as a parachute. This mainsail can also be detached to become a large glider. The Series Bible written during the initial production of the show says that the Wraith was built with lumber from mystical trees on a remote island and that the lumber still retains the life-force of those trees, making the ship seem as if it is haunted or has a mind of its own. 
 The Maelstrom – Bloth's massive and deadly warship. It is built from the bleached carcasses of leviathans, and resembles a gargantuan floating fossil. Below the main deck sits a labyrinth of passageways, sewer lines, holding cells, and slaves' quarters. The dreaded Constrictus lives in the bowels of this death vessel.

About Mer
Mer is a planet very different from Earth with a variety of its own creatures with varying degrees of intelligence, such as the monkey-bird and the leviathans. The world has twenty seas, and most of the crew's stops are made at islands. Parts of Mer are continually in flux, like a river of spiked rocks that rises out of the ocean in the first episode and appears to defy physics (none of the characters are bewildered by the spectacle aside from its danger), but whether this is the Dark Water's doing or just the nature of the geologically hyperactive planet is unknown.   

Octopon was once the greatest city on Mer, referred to as "the jewel in the crown of Mer" by Ioz in episode 14, though it lies in ruin until Ren collects the first seven treasures. It is then partially restored. Octopon seems to have been centuries ahead of the current technological state of Mer, although it is probable that civilization is continually in decline due to the Dark Water oozing from the planet's core.

Episodes

Season 1 (1991)

Season 2 (1992–93)

Production
David Kirschner, the president and chief executive officer of Hanna-Barbera, created the series based on an idea he had when he was a child, inspired by "the works of Robert Louis Stevenson and the pictures of Howard Pyle and N.C. Wyeth". The original five-episode miniseries was "the most expensive animated project" Hanna-Barbera had taken on up to that time, with each half-hour episode costing US$500,000. Each half-hour episode consisted of 12,000 cels, double the number "of a typical Saturday morning cartoon series".

Overseas animation studios
 Fil-Cartoons, Inc., Manila, Philippines
 Tama Production Co., Ltd., Tokyo, Japan (episodes 1–2, 5)
 Wang Film Productions Co., Ltd., Taipei, Taiwan (episode 3–4)
 Mr. Big Cartoons, Sydney, New South Wales, Australia (episode 3–4)

Other studios
 Madhouse, Inc., Tokyo, Japan
 Big Star Enterprise, Inc., Seoul, South Korea
 Kennedy Cartoons
 Toronto, Ontario, Canada
 Manila, Philippines

Broadcast and release
The show first premiered on Fox Kids in early 1991 as a five-part mini-series titled Dark Water. Following a number of animation tweaks and other changes by Hanna-Barbera, those episodes were rebroadcast later in 1991 as the first five episodes of the regular series. Notably, the original mini-series featured the voice of Roddy McDowall as Niddler, whereas in the revised version, the character was voiced by Frank Welker.

The first season, consisting of 13 episodes, aired on ABC.  The second season, consisting of the last 8 episodes, aired in first-run syndication as part of The Funtastic World of Hanna-Barbera. The series was never completed, ending abruptly after 21 episodes with only eight of the thirteen treasures collected.

Home media
On August 31, 2010, Warner Archive released The Pirates of Dark Water: The Complete Series on DVD in region 1 as part of their Hanna–Barbera Classics Collection.  This is a Manufacture-on-Demand (MOD) release, available exclusively through Warner's online store and Amazon.com.

Reception
The Pirates of Dark Water was reviewed favorably in The Scarecrow Video Movie Guide, which contrasted it with other cartoons from the same period, noting that it was "...serious, well-written, and had a certain amount of craft in its character animation and watercolor backgrounds."  Collider called it one of the 14 greatest kids cartoons of the 1990s as well as a property worthy of resurrection.  Screen Rant said the show "has a robust cult following to this day and was one of the best adventure shows of its era, with surprisingly strong writing and a beautifully designed world."

In other media

Comics
In November 1991, Marvel Comics produced a comic book series based on the show. Originally intended as a six-part limited series, it was extended to nine issues to include a three-part original story. A series of action figures based on the characters from the show was also produced. The toyline consisted of Ren, Niddler, Ioz, Zoolie, Bloth, Konk, Mantus, Joat, and the Wraith.

Video games
Pirates of Dark Water video games were released for the Super NES and Sega Genesis platforms, both published by Sunsoft. The Super NES version is a side-scrolling beat 'em up, co-developed by Japanese and American staff members, where players can choose to play as Ren, Tula or Ioz and proceed to fight Bloth's gang. Up to two players can play simultaneously. Each character has a life-draining Desperation Attack (spinning kick for Ren, ecomancer energy for Tula, and spinning punch for Ioz) and the ability to block – something not common in games of this genre. The Genesis version, developed by Team Iguana (later known as Acclaim Studios Austin), is a side scrolling platform game with role-playing elements. A Pirates of Dark Water role-playing game was released in 1994 but had a limited production run.

Niddler was parodied in 1993's Might and Magic V: Darkside of Xeen, as Nibbler the Monkeydog, who loved Monga Melons.

Cartoon Network interstitials
The show was parodied in one of a series of early interstitials on Cartoon Network. These commercials featured a "viewer's" question and Cartoon Network's comical take on the "answer". In Pirates' case, it was on the "unaired episodes". Cartoon Network claimed to have the episodes on tape and promised to air them, instead showing footage of a kitten lapping milk, suggesting that someone taped over the only copy of what would have been the nonexistent episodes.

References

External links
 

1990s American animated television series
1991 American television series debuts
1993 American television series endings
American Broadcasting Company original programming
American children's animated action television series
American children's animated space adventure television series
American children's animated fantasy television series
Fox Kids
Television series about pirates
Television shows adapted into comics
Television shows adapted into video games
Television series by Hanna-Barbera
Television series set on fictional planets
The Funtastic World of Hanna-Barbera
YTV (Canadian TV channel) original programming
English-language television shows
Works about princes